High Hesket is a village near the A6 road, in the parish of Hesket, in the Eden district, in the English county of Cumbria. The village was on the A6 road until it was by-passed.

Amenities 
High Hesket has a place of worship and a school.

See also

Listed buildings in Hesket, Cumbria
Tarn Wadling

References 

 Philip's Street Atlas Cumbria (page 41)

Villages in Cumbria
Eden District